The Central Charlestown Butcher Boys is an Australian rugby league football club based in Charlestown, New South Wales formed in 1910. They currently play in the Newcastle Rugby League competition

Notable player 
Newcastle born Clive Churchill was graded as a fullback with Central Newcastle in 1946. He played for Country Seconds in 1946 which brought him to the attention of talent scouts from Sydney and he eventually signed with NSWRFL team South Sydney from 1947.

Churchill, who would be dubbed "The Little Master" would amass one of the most impressive records in Australian Rugby League history.
Rodney Howe (1992-04 Newcastle Knights, Perth Reds & Melbourne Storm)
Tim Maddison (1993-03 Newcastle Knights, Hunter Mariners, Sydney Roosters & North Queensland Cowboys)
Timana Tahu (1999-14 Newcastle Knights, Parramatta Eels & Penrith Panthers)
Grant Anderson (2022- Melbourne Storm)
 Luke Walsh (2007-18 Newcastle Knights, Penrith Panthers, St Helens, Catalans Dragons.)

See also

References 

Rugby clubs established in 1910
1910 establishments in Australia
Rugby league teams in Newcastle, New South Wales